Todogto (Toodogto) is a rural locality (a selo) in Zaigrayevsky District, Republic of Buryatia, Russia. The population was 112 as of 2010. There are 2 streets.

Geography 
Todogto is located 32 km northwest of Zaigrayevo (the district's administrative centre) by road. Onokhoy is the nearest rural locality.

References 

Rural localities in Zaigrayevsky District